McGirk may refer to:

 Mathias McGirk (1783–1842), Missouri Supreme Court justice
 McGirk, Missouri, an unincorporated community in Moniteau County, Missouri
 McGirk, Texas, a ghost town in Hamilton County, Texas